Papyrus 40 (in the Gregory-Aland numbering), designated by 𝔓40, is an early copy of the New Testament in Greek. The manuscript paleographically has been assigned to the 3rd century.

Description 
It is a papyrus manuscript of the Epistle to the Romans, it contains Romans 1:24-27; 1:31-2:3; 3:21-4:8; 6:4-5.16; 9:16-17.27.

The Greek text of this codex is a representative of the Alexandrian text-type, rather proto-Alexandrian, Aland named it as "Free text", and placed it in Category I because of its date.

This manuscript is closer to Codex Sinaiticus than to Codex Alexandrinus and Vaticanus.

It is currently housed at the Papyrussammlung der Universität in the University of Heidelberg (Inv. no. 45).

See also 
 List of New Testament papyri

References

Further reading 
 Friedrich Bilabel, Römerbrieffragmente, VBP IV, (Heidelberg 1924), pp. 28–31.

External links 
 VBP IV 57
 P40 Heidelberg, Institut für Papyrologie Inv G 645, Digital MSI at CSNTM

New Testament papyri
3rd-century biblical manuscripts
Early Greek manuscripts of the New Testament
Epistle to the Romans papyri